This is a list of American football players who played only one game in the National Football League (NFL) during the league's second decade from 1930 to the 1939. This list does not include those who were on an active roster but never actually appeared in a game. Nor does it include those who appeared only in a pre-season or exhibition game.

Key
 Date - The "Date" column provides the date of the player's appearance in an NFL game. If the exact date has not yet been verified, then the column simply lists the year.
 Start - The "Start" column states whether or not the player's appearance in an NFL game was as a "starter". If the player appeared in the game as a substitute, the entry should state "No".

1930

1931

1932

1933

1934

1935

1936

1937

1938

1939

References

One gamers